Deliphrosoma is a genus of beetles belonging to the family Staphylinidae.

The species of this genus are found in Europe.

Species:
 Deliphrosoma angulatum Assing & Wunderle, 2001 
 Deliphrosoma bakhtiyariense Zerche, 1991

References

Staphylinidae
Staphylinidae genera